Casa Cipriani is a hotel and private membership club that opened in August 2021 in the Battery Maritime Building, a ferry terminal, in lower Manhattan, New York City. While initial work rehabilitating the structure was completed by other entities, the final project and conversion, which includes a jazz cafe along with typical hotel amenities, was done in partnership with the New York City Economic Development Corporation, Midtown Equities, Centaur Properties, and Cipriani. For the physical conversion, Marvel Architects worked with Thierry Despont.

References

External links

Hotels in New York City
Buildings and structures in Manhattan
Lower Manhattan
2021 establishments in New York City
Clubhouses in Manhattan